Warhammer 40,000 Collectible Card Game, sometimes denoted WH40KCCG is an out-of-print collectible card game released in 2001 by Sabertooth Games. It is set in the fictional Warhammer 40,000 universe. The players may select various factions around which they could base their personalized deck. These factions include Orks, Space Marines, Chaos, Eldar, Tyranids, Imperial Guard, and Dark Eldar; there were also sub-factions (such as individual Space Marines chapters).

Expansions 

 Siege of Malogrim Hive
 Invasion: Verdicon
 Battle for Delos V (June/July 2002)
 Coronis Campaign (Mar 2002)
 Battle for Pandora Prime (November 2001)

Factions 

 Chaos
 Dark Eldar
 Eldar
 Imperial Guard
 Gantor
 Ork Hunters
 Rubber Suit
 Space Marines
 Blood Angels
 Dark Angels
Space Wolves
 Ork
 Tyranid
 Arachnia

Further reading
Strategy in Scrye #52
Strategy in Scrye #58
Strategy in Scrye #68

References

External links 

 WH40KCCG on Board Game Geek

Card games introduced in 2001
Warhammer 40,000 card games
Collectible card games